Mehran Rural District is a rural district (dehestan) in the Central District of Bandar Lengeh County, Hormozgan Province, Iran. In accordance with the 2006 census, its population was 8,071, in 1,564 families. The rural district has 27 villages.

References 

Rural Districts of Hormozgan Province
Bandar Lengeh County